Zaviša Milosavljević  (Serbian Cyrillic: Завиша Милосављевић; born 14 July 1961) is a Serbian football manager.

Milosavljević was a professor of physical education at the University of Belgrade. He is a former coach of the Serbian under-16 and under-19 national teams. He also coached five clubs in his native Serbia, including top-flight outfits FK Mogren and Dinamo Belgrade.

From 1999 to 2001, Milosavljević managed FK Bor in the Serbian second division before coaching APR FC in Rwanda for a year, winning the national cup and national Super Cup in 2002. He then spent four years as Serbia’s Under-19 coach before his appointment by the Lesotho Football Association to take over the national team. However he was sacked after disappointing result. He was appointed as the Pakistan national team coach, a job he took up in November 2011. He has mainly focused to improve infrastructure and bring on foreign based Pakistani players. In August 2013 Milosavljević was removed from his post as Pakistan national team coach after only winning 3 out of 12 games. In January 2014, Milosavljević left his role at the PPF's youth training academy to become the new manager of Kyrgyz club Dordoi Bishkek. On 27 October 2015, Milosavljević resigned as manager of Dordoi Bishkek.

References

1961 births
Living people
People from Bor, Serbia
Lesotho national football team managers
Expatriate football managers in Lesotho
Pakistan national football team managers
Expatriate football managers in Pakistan
Serbian football managers
Academic staff of the University of Belgrade
Serbian expatriate sportspeople in Pakistan
Expatriate football managers in Kyrgyzstan
FC Dordoi Bishkek managers
Expatriate football managers in Uzbekistan
FK Bor managers
Expatriate football managers in Rwanda
Serbian expatriate sportspeople in Lesotho
FK Timok managers
Serbian expatriate sportspeople in Uzbekistan
Serbian expatriate sportspeople in Kyrgyzstan
Serbian expatriate sportspeople in Rwanda
Serbian expatriate football managers